Ex-Mormon or post-Mormon refers to a disaffiliate of the Church of Jesus Christ of Latter-day Saints (LDS Church) or any of its schismatic breakoffs, collectively called "Mormonism". Ex-Mormons—sometimes referred to as exmo or postmo—may neither believe in nor affiliate with the LDS Church. In contrast, Jack Mormons may believe but do not affiliate; and cultural Mormons may or may not affiliate but do not believe in certain doctrines or practices of the LDS Church. The distinction is important to a large segment of ex-Mormons, many of whom consider their decision to leave as morally compelling and socially risky. According to 2014 Pew data, around 1/3 of adults raised LDS no longer adhere to the faith (up from around 10% in the 1970s and 1980s) and in 2008 only 25% of LDS young adults are actively involved. Many ex-Mormons experience troubles with family members who still follow Mormon teachings. Aggregations of ex-Mormons may comprise a social movement.

Reasons for leaving

Most ex-Mormons leave Mormonism and the LDS Church because specific intellectual or spiritual reasons have led them to a conviction that the religion is false. The foremost reasons are disbelief both in Joseph Smith as a prophet and in the Book of Mormon as a religious and historical document. Reasons for this disbelief include issues with anthropological, linguistic, archaeological, and genetic evidence against the Book of Mormon in the New World. In addition to rejecting the Book of Mormon for such reasons, the Book of Abraham and other Mormon religious texts are rejected on similar grounds. A study of 3000 people who were formerly affiliated with the LDS Church  recorded that 74 percent of respondents cited a disbelief in church doctrine or theology as major reason for leaving the church, but only 4 percent of respondents cited conflict with other church members as a large factor in their decision to leave. Also, just 4 percent claimed that a significant reason for apostasy was dissatisfaction with the rules of conduct professed by the LDS Church. This corroborates the assertion that many Mormons are satisfied with the communal aspect and attributes of LDS Church life.

Individuals leave Mormonism for a variety of reasons, although "single reason disaffiliates are rare among former Mormons." Research shows that 43 percent of ex-Mormon left due to unmet spiritual needs. Other reasons for leaving may include a belief that they are in a cult, logical or intellectual appraisal, belief changes or differences, spiritual conversion to another faith, life crises, and poor or hurtful responsiveness by Mormon leaders or congregations. Of former Mormons surveyed, 58 percent switched to other faiths or practices.

Those who adopt humanist or feminist perspectives may view certain Mormon doctrines (including past teachings on the spiritual status of black people, polygamy, and the role of women in society) as racist or sexist.

A minority of ex-Mormons cite their personal incompatibility with Mormon beliefs or culture. A 2003 Princeton Review publication quoted a student at church-owned Brigham Young University as stating, "the nonconformist will find a dull social life with difficulty finding someone that will be their friend, regardless of who they are or what they believe." Liberal views and political attitudes that challenge this conformity, and occasionally sexual orientation, are cited as reasons for leaving Mormonism.

In recent years, the LDS Church has become more politically active, particularly with regard to legislation barring civil marriage for same-sex couples. Official church involvement in the California Proposition 8 campaign was highly controversial, causing some Mormons to stop attending church.

Post-disaffiliation issues

After their decision to leave Mormonism and the LDS Church, ex-Mormons typically go through an adjustment period as they re-orient their lives religiously, socially, and psychologically.

Religious
An online poll of ex-Mormons found that a majority of ex-Mormons do not self-identify as a member of another faith tradition, choosing to describe themselves as agnostic, atheist or simply ex-Mormon. Some can also become apatheist. A Pew Research report corroborated this, finding in 2015 that 36% of those born Mormon left the religion, with 21% of born Mormons (58% of ex-Mormons) now unaffiliated, 6% evangelical Protestant, and 9% converting to other Protestant, Catholic, or a non-Christian faith. Others either retained belief in God but not in organized religion or became adherents of other faiths. Among ex-Mormons with no current religious preference, 36 percent continued the practice of prayer often or daily. Ex-Mormon attitudes toward Mormons and Mormonism vary widely. Some ex-Mormons actively proselytize against Mormonism, while some provide only support to others leaving the religion. Other ex-Mormons prefer to avoid the subject entirely, while still others may try to encourage healthy dialogue between adherents of their new faiths and active Mormons. Attitudes of ex-Mormons also differ regarding their church membership. Some formally resign, which the LDS Church refers to as "name removal", while others simply stop attending church services.

Social
Ex-Mormons who publicly leave Mormonism often face social stigmatization. Although many leave to be true to themselves or to a new belief structure, they leave at a cost; many leave feeling ostracized and pressured and miss out on major family events such as temple weddings. Family members of some may express only disappointment and sorrow and try to reach out in understanding to their new belief system or lack thereof. Some stay under threat of divorce from spouses who still believe. Still, many ex-Mormons are completely shunned and have given up spouses, children, and the ability to enter Mormon temples to witness life events of family members. Ex-Mormons in geographic locations away from major enclaves of Mormon culture such as Utah may experience less stigmatization, however.

Psychological
Many ex-Mormons go through a psychological process as they leave Mormonism. Former Mormon Bob McCue described his disaffiliation as recovery from cognitive dissonance. Reynolds reports that leaving involves a period of intense self-doubt and depression as disaffiliates confront feelings of betrayal and loneliness, followed by self-discovery, belief exploration, spiritual guidance and connection as they leave Mormonism. He argues that leaving may provide a renewed sense of self, confidence and peace. One ex-Mormon compared his disaffiliation experience to leaving a cult, while others called it close to overcoming mind control or adjusting to life outside of religious fundamentalism. Still others compare their symptoms to divorce from marriage. Ex-Mormons may also have to cope with the pain of ostracism by Mormon employers, friends, spouses, and family members., further studies would need to be done to compare ex-Mormons with ex members of other religious communities in order to see if the psychology of an ex-Mormon is unique.

Ex-Mormon organizations
Many formerly LDS individuals seek community and discussion about their former beliefs in online and in-person groups. Some of these international groups include the ex-Mormon page on Reddit (with over 250,000 subscribers) as well as various group listings on the Mormon Spectrum website. Localized groups include the SLC Postmos meetup and Facebook group (with over 2,000 members) and Utah Valley Postmos meetup and Facebook group (over 900 members). The ex-Mormon subreddit gained publicity with its involvement leaking LDS documents.

Latter-day Saint views of ex-Mormons
Depending on the circumstances of an ex-Mormon's departure, Latter-day Saint views may range from considering them apostates to viewing them as individuals who have simply strayed from the path. The LDS Church teaches that people leave for a variety of reasons. Reasons range from trivial to serious (including doctrinal disagreements). Latter-day Saints view "denying the Holy Spirit" as having potentially devastating spiritual consequences, and they generally hope ex-Mormons will "return to the fold".

Reasons for leaving as reported by LDS Church

The reasons given for a person leaving the church vary according to who is offering the opinion. LDS Church Sunday School manuals say members leave because of unwarranted pride, committing sins which drive them to alienation from God, or because they have taken offense to something trivial. A 2003 manual claims some members of the early Church left because they had been deceived by Satan, who, according to Mormon scripture, is actively seeking to destroy the souls of men. Furthermore, those who "depart from the truth" will be judged in the final judgment for falling prey to this deception. The deceptions that Satan uses include acceptance of a false prophet, pride and vanity, being critical of leaders' imperfections, being offended, rationalizing disobedience, and accepting the false teachings of the world. 
	
In the Book of Mormon, a figure named Korihor preaches disbelief and challenges prophecies and church leaders. He then demands a miracle and is miraculously struck mute for the acts. One Mormon scholar likened the philosophical analysis employed in an essay compilation edited by an ex-Mormon to Korihor's tactics. Church authority and popular LDS fiction writer Gerald N. Lund compares any reasoning that leads to disbelief in God or Mormonism to Korihor.

Mormon historian B. H. Roberts wrote of an account of a member leaving the LDS Church over the misspelling of a name in church records. The LDS Church has used the story of Frazier Eaton (who gave $700 for the Kirtland Temple but left after being unable to get a seat at the dedication ceremony) as an object lesson on how members can leave after being offended.

In October 2013, Dieter F. Uchtdorf taught: "The search for truth has led millions of people to The Church of Jesus Christ of Latter-day Saints. However, there are some who leave the Church they once loved. One might ask, 'If the gospel is so wonderful, why would anyone leave?' Sometimes we assume it is because they have been offended or lazy or sinful. Actually, it is not that simple. In fact, there is not just one reason that applies to the variety of situations. Some of our dear members struggle for years with the question whether they should separate themselves from the Church. In this Church that honors personal agency so strongly, that was restored by a young man who asked questions and sought answers, we respect those who honestly search for truth. It may break our hearts when their journey takes them away from the Church we love and the truth we have found, but we honor their right to worship Almighty God according to the dictates of their own conscience, just as we claim that privilege for ourselves."

Consequences of leaving
Early Latter-day Saints were taught to consider ex-Mormons as stronger candidates for eternal damnation based on their former devotion to Mormonism, since those who were never adherents will be judged more lightly. The LDS Church taught "When individuals or groups of people turn away from the principles of the gospel, they are in a state of apostasy." In addition, one who goes so far as to deny the Holy Spirit could become a son of perdition and be cast into outer darkness. Outright apostasy of members will lead to a church disciplinary council, which may result in disfellowshipment or excommunication. However, members who ask for their names to be removed from church records or who have joined another church are not subject to a disciplinary council.

Brigham Young, a president of the LDS Church from 1847 to 1877, taught that members who openly disagree with church leaders are cursed or condemned and that those who reject Mormon doctrine or authority outright are "apostate". An early Mormon epistle teaches that apostates have "fallen into the snares of the evil one."

Young also said that "[if] there is a despicable character on the face of the earth, it is an apostate from this Church. He is a traitor who has deceived his best friends, betrayed his trust, and forfeited every principle of honor that God placed within him. They may think they are respected, but they are not. They are disgraced in their own eyes. There is not much honesty within them; they have forfeited their heaven, sold their birthright, and betrayed their friends."

Demographics
According to a BYU Studies article, as of 2014, about one-third of those with a Latter-day Saint background have left the Church. Of those who leave the Church, about 58% switch to no religion or unaffiliated; 18% switch to evangelical Protestant groups; 8% went to Mainline Protestant denominations; 10% went to generic Christianity; and 6% went to "other".

See also 
 
Religious disaffiliation
Exmormon Foundation
Lost boys (Mormon fundamentalism)
Lapsed Catholic
List of former or dissident LDS
Stay LDS
Blogs about Mormonism or Mormons
:Category:People excommunicated by the Church of Jesus Christ of Latter-day Saints
Ed Decker

References

Further reading

External links
 
The Exmormon Foundation - an organization dedicated to supporting those in transition from Mormonism
Recovery from Mormonism - the most prominent ex-Mormon community on the web
MormonNoMore - Information on how to resign from the LDS Church
Utah Lighthouse Ministry - Founded by ex-Mormons Jerald and Sandra Tanner

Disengagement from religion
 
Latter Day Saint terms
Mormon, Ex